"Back to the Wall" is a song by Australian rock group Divinyls. Released in February 1988 as the lead single from their third studio album Temperamental, the song made the top forty on the Australian singles chart.

Background
By October 1986, Divinyls had been reduced to the duo of Christina Amphlett and Mark McEntee. Their third studio album Temperamental was in the recording stages and their label Chrysalis Records informed them that it would be make-or-break record, largely depending on whether it received attention internationally such as in the US.

Legacy

The song was played in the 1988 hit horror film A Nightmare on Elm Street 4: The Dream Master and is on the soundtrack to the film.

In 2018, the song was covered by Tropical Fuck Storm and appeared as the b-side to their single "You Let My Tyres Down". The cover garnered praise and has been called "a spine-tingling take on an underrated Divinyls classic [...] [T]he vocal delivery of Fiona Kitschin and Erica Dunn, at once fierce and vulnerable, lends a prescient edge to Chrissy Amphlett’s lyrics: "We are living in desperate times / These are desperate times, my dear"." Kitschin herself called it "a really timely song [...] written and sung by a woman, so it made sense to be performed by the women in the band."

Track listing
Australian 7" single
 "Back to the Wall" - 4:38
 "Fighting" - 3:45

Australian 12" single
 "Back to the Wall" - 4:38
 "Fighting" - 3:45
 "Out of Time" - 5:46

Charts

References

1988 singles
Divinyls songs
Song recordings produced by Mike Chapman
Songs written by Chrissy Amphlett
Songs written by Richard Feldman (songwriter)
Songs written by Mark McEntee
1988 songs
Chrysalis Records singles